= Leonard Zablow =

- Born: New York City, New York
- Education: California Institute of Technology (BS); Columbia University (MA)
- Spouse: Ellen Sosnow (m. 1950)
- Scientific career
- Fields: Biology

Leonard Zablow is an American biologist and an Elected Fellow of the American Association for the Advancement of Science since 1967.
